Ectenessa angusticollis is a species of beetle in the family Cerambycidae. It was described by Buquet in 1860.

References

Ectenessini
Beetles described in 1860